Beautiful Strangers is a 2015 Philippine television drama series broadcast by GMA Network. Directed by Albert Langitan, it stars Heart Evangelista and Lovi Poe. It premiered on August 10, 2015, on the network's Telebabad line up replacing Let the Love Begin. The series concluded on November 27, 2015, with a total of 80 episodes. It was replaced by Because of You in its timeslot.

The series is streaming online on YouTube.

Premise
The story revolves around Kristine and Joyce. Their lives intertwine when Kristine helps the homeless amnesiac Leah, which is Joyce who was sexually abused by Kristine's father. They become friends and will eventually find out the truth.

Cast and characters

Lead cast
 Heart Evangelista as Kristine de Jesus Castillo-Ilagan
 Lovi Poe as Jocelyn "Joyce" Rodriguez-Castillo / Lea

Supporting cast
 Christopher De Leon as Ronaldo Castillo
 Dina Bonnevie as Alejandra Valdez-Castillo
 Rocco Nacino as Noel Ilagan
 Benjamin Alves as Lawrence "Lance" Castillo
 Emilio Garcia as Nestor Ilagan
 Kier Legaspi as Rigor Lacsamana
 Ayen Munji-Laurel as Lourdes de Jesus
 Lovely Rivero as Imelda Rodriguez
 Renz Valerio as Jason Rodriguez
 Mariel Pamintuan as Leslie de Jesus
 Gabriel de Leon as Rex Buenaventura
 Djanin Cruz as Hannah Mamaril
 Dianne Medina as Monica Aragon
 Nar Cabico as Shakira / Rodolfo Vicente
 Divina Valencia as Salve Valdez
 Rez Cortez as Mike Mamaril

Recurring cast
 Gabby Eigenmann as Isagani Mendoza
 Ervic Vijandre
 Diva Montelaba as Georgia Lacsamana

Guest cast
 Pen Medina as Andres Rodriguez
 Toby Alejar
 Rafa Siguion-Reyna
 Ozu Ong
 Bing Babao
 Robbie Sy
 Maimai Davao
 Rina Reyes
 Crispin Pineda
 Mike Magat
 Paolo Rivero
 Luz Fernandez

Ratings
According to AGB Nielsen Philippines' Mega Manila household television ratings, the pilot episode of Beautiful Strangers earned a 21.4% rating. While the final episode scored a 21.7% rating. The series had its highest rating on September 10, 2015, with a 22.6% rating. For its entire run, it had an average rating of 19.78%.

Accolades

References

External links
 
 

2015 Philippine television series debuts
2015 Philippine television series endings
Filipino-language television shows
GMA Network drama series
Television shows set in the Philippines